Francisco Marmolejo Mancilla (born 19 January 1988) is a Spanish footballer who plays for Víkingur Reykjavik.

Honours
Víkingur FC
Icelandic Cup: 2019

References

External links
 
 
 
 

Spanish footballers
Spanish expatriate footballers
Allsvenskan players
1988 births
Living people
Atlético Malagueño players
Écija Balompié players
Marbella FC players
CD El Palo players
Jönköpings Södra IF players
Ungmennafélagið Víkingur players
Knattspyrnufélagið Víkingur players
Expatriate footballers in Iceland
Association football goalkeepers